Constabulary may have several definitions:
A civil, non-paramilitary (police) force consisting of police officers called constables. This is the usual definition in the United Kingdom, in which all county police forces once bore the title (and some still do). Constables also exist in some U.S. states including Texas.
In English-speaking Canada, the starting rank of all police officers is Constable. The provincial police service of Newfoundland and Labrador is the Royal Newfoundland Constabulary. This term reflects the force’s history of having been modelled after the Royal Irish Constabulary. In this case, Constabulary is used in the same sense in which it is used in the UK.  
A large civil police force organised and trained along military lines, which may contain paramilitary elements. This is the usual definition in places outside Great Britain such as the former Royal Irish Constabulary, the former Royal Ulster Constabulary, Royal Newfoundland Constabulary, Jamaica Constabulary Force.
A military or paramilitary type force consisting of soldiers trained for police duties. Mostly established by the United States in the several countries over which it had protective status e.g. Philippine Constabulary; United States Constabulary in West Germany after World War II. These forces also performed military functions by maintaining "mobile forces" of organised units.

Current UK police services titled "constabulary"
 Avon and Somerset Constabulary
 Belfast International Airport Constabulary
 Cambridgeshire Constabulary
 Cheshire Constabulary
 Civil Nuclear Constabulary
 Derbyshire Constabulary
 Durham Constabulary
 Gloucestershire Constabulary 
 Hampshire Constabulary
 Hampstead Heath Constabulary
 Havering Parks Constabulary
 Hertfordshire Constabulary
 Kew Constabulary
 Lancashire Constabulary
 Norfolk Constabulary
 Suffolk Constabulary

Current constabularies in the Netherlands

 Royal Marechaussee
 Dienst Speciale Interventies
 Brigade Speciale Beveiligingsopdrachten

Historic constabularies
Philippines
 Philippine Constabulary – created in 1901 by the American colonial administration. It was demilitarised and merged with the Integrated National Police in 1991 to form the Philippine National Police.

Ireland
 Royal Irish Constabulary – The United Kingdom's paramilitary police force in Ireland from 1822–1922.

Northern Ireland
 Royal Ulster Constabulary – The United Kingdom's police force in Northern Ireland from 1922 – 2001 when it was reformed as the Police Service of Northern Ireland.
 Ulster Special Constabulary – a reserve police force from 1920 until it was disbanded in 1970.

Free City of Danzig
 Free City of Danzig Police – The law enforcement agency of the semi-autonomous Free City of Danzig from 1919 - 1945.

United States
 United States Constabulary – United States Army military gendarmerie force. From 1946 to 1952, in the aftermath of World War II, it acted as an occupation and security force in the U.S. Occupation Zone of West Germany and Austria.
 Pennsylvania State Constables – an elected office held in all Pennsylvania townships, boroughs, and cities except Philadelphia; unrelated to the Pennsylvania State Police

Malaysia
 North Borneo Constabulary – The paramilitary police force of North Borneo from 1800s to 1963 where it was officially incorporated into Royal Malaysia Police shortly after the formation of Malaysia.
 Sarawak Constabulary – The paramilitary police force of Kingdom of Sarawak from 1800s to 1963 where it was officially incorporated into Royal Malaysia Police shortly after the formation of Malaysia.

Further reading 
Segal, David R., Brian J. Reed, and David E. Rohall. “Constabulary Attitudes of National Guard and Regular Soldiers in the U.S. Army.” Armed Forces & Society, Jul 1998; Vol. 24: pp. 535–548. http://afs.sagepub.com/cgi/content/abstract/24/4/535
Moskos, Charles C., Jr. “UN Peacekeepers: The Constabulary Ethic and Military Professionalism.” Armed Forces & Society, Jul 1975; Vol. 1: pp. 388–401.

External links

Law enforcement units